The 1994 season in the Latvian Higher League, named Virslīga, was the fourth domestic competition since the Baltic nation gained independence from the Soviet Union on 6 September 1991. Twelve teams competed in this edition, with Skonto FC claiming the title.

Final table

Match table

Top scorers

Awards

Skonto FC 1994

References
RSSSF
Skonto FC 1994

Latvian Higher League seasons
1
Latvia
Latvia